The 2017 Kuwait Super Cup was between league, Crown Cup and Emir Cup champions Kuwait SC and League Runners-up Qadsia SC. where Kuwait SC won 5-4 on penalties after 0-0 draw at full time.

References

External links
Kuwait League Fixtures and Results at FIFA
Kuwaiti Super Cup (Arabic)
xscores.com Kuwait 
goalzz.com - Super Cup
RSSSF.com - Kuwait - List of Champions

Super Cup
Kuwait SC matches
Kuwait Super Cup